Gabriel Covarrubias Ibarra (3 July 1930 – 2 August 2018) was a Mexican politician and a member of the Institutional Revolutionary Party (PRI). 

Covarrubias was a public accountant by profession and worked for the state treasury before entering politics. He served as municipal president of Guadalajara from 1989 to 1992. As municipal president, he make his own count of inhabitants after disagreeing with the figures from the INEGI. Covarrubias led the filing of a legal appeal against the electricity tariffs of the CFE. He also received recognition for refusing to grant authorization for a gay pride parade. He also served as president of the board of reconstruction after the explosions of 22 April 1992. He was elected as a member of the LIV Legislature of the Congress of Jalisco.

He was a Senator from 1997 to 2000, serving on a number of commissions including Industrial Development, Agriculture, Livestock and Rural Development, and Treasury and Credit.

Covarrubias died on 2 August 2018 in Guadalajara.

References

1930 births
2018 deaths
Institutional Revolutionary Party politicians
Municipal presidents of Guadalajara, Jalisco
Members of the Congress of Jalisco
Members of the Senate of the Republic (Mexico)
20th-century Mexican politicians
Politicians from Guadalajara, Jalisco